Juuso Nevalainen (born May 2, 1997) is a Finnish professional ice hockey right winger currently playing for IPK in Mestis.

Nevalainen previously played six games for KalPa during the 2016–17 Liiga season and scored no points. He then had a loan spell with IPK in the 2017–18 season before joining them on a permanent basis on May 17, 2019.

References

External links

1997 births
Living people
Finnish ice hockey right wingers
KalPa players
Iisalmen Peli-Karhut players
People from Forssa
Sportspeople from Kanta-Häme